The 1999 Miller Lite 200 was the fourteenth round of the 1999 CART FedEx Champ Car World Series season, held on August 15, 1999, at the Mid-Ohio Sports Car Course in Lexington, Ohio.

Report

Race 
Dario Franchitti, the championship leader took his first pole of the season after the Saturday qualifying was washed out due to rain, which meant that the grid was decided by Friday qualifying times. Franchitti led away at the start followed by Bryan Herta, although Paul Tracy soon passed Herta and took second. The Team Green duo of Franchitti and Tracy then pulled away from the field, building a lead of 12 seconds. After the first round of pit stops, Franchitti and Tracy stayed 1-2, but Juan Pablo Montoya was up to third after a quick stop. He was 15 seconds behind the Team Green cars, but he was unfazed by that and set about closing it down, and did so rapidly such that the top three cars were nose to tail before the second round of pit stops. Franchitti pitted, handing Tracy the lead, but that did not last for long as he was immediately passed by Montoya. Montoya and Tracy both made their second pit stops and both joined ahead of Franchitti before a caution due to Luiz Garcia Jr.'s spin bunched the field up. Tracy and Franchitti were quicker than anyone else on the track, but both were absolutely no match for Montoya, who set a stunning pace in the final stint once the track went green, and won by over 10 seconds. Tracy finished second and Franchitti third, which was enough for him to keep his championship lead, although it was down to 1 point.

Classification

Race

Caution flags

Lap Leaders

Point standings after race

References 

1999 in CART
Miller Lite 200
Indy 200 at Mid-Ohio